Dušan Devečka (Liptovský Mikuláš, 19 June 1980) is a Slovak professional ice hockey player who played with HC Poprad in the Slovak Extraliga.

References

External links

1980 births
Sportspeople from Liptovský Mikuláš
Living people
HC Slovan Bratislava players
Slovak ice hockey defencemen
Slovak expatriate ice hockey players in the Czech Republic
Expatriate ice hockey players in Austria
Expatriate ice hockey players in Kazakhstan
Expatriate ice hockey players in Poland
Slovak expatriate sportspeople in Kazakhstan
Slovak expatriate sportspeople in Poland
Slovak expatriate sportspeople in Austria